Sitting Ducks is a lithograph created by the poster artist Michael Bedard in 1977. It depicts a literal interpretation of the idiom "sitting duck". Three ducks are relaxing in the sun on white chairs by the poolside, one looks up and notices two bullet holes in the wall.

Bedard then went on to create an entire series of "Sitting Ducks" related lithographs, which culminated in a children's book, a cartoon series and a video game.

Book
Bedard's 1998 book Sitting Ducks has the plot that alligators hatch ducks in a "duck factory", then send them to Ducktown, where the ducks live an idyllic life, encouraged by billboards to fatten up. The alligators presumably eat the ducks once they are fat. One duck is befriended by an alligator, who lets him know that if only the Ducktown residents would not get fat, they could fly away and avoid being eaten.

Cartoon

In 2001 Sitting Ducks was produced by Creative Capers Entertainment and Kristlin/Elliott Digital in Association with Universal Pictures Visual Programming. It ran for two seasons and during that time spawned merchandise such as toys, clothing, books, as well as a video game.

The show takes place in a town called Ducktown and focuses on a duck named Bill, and his best friend Aldo, a huge alligator from the neighboring town of Swampwood. Seeing as how ducks are favorite snacks of the alligators there, Bill and Aldo's friendship is rather unusual. The pair usually end up in various situations and adventures.

The show lasted 2 seasons, airing 26 episodes. Reruns aired on Qubo.

External links
 Bedard's Personal Studio Website

Fictional ducks